(Patriotic wine song), WAB 91, is a song composed by Anton Bruckner in 1866 during his stay in Linz.

History 
Bruckner composed this work, together with Vaterlandslied, on a six-strophe text of August Silberstein in November 1866 during his stay in Linz on request of Anton M. Storch. The song was performed by the Liedertafel Frohsinn on 13 February 1868 under Bruckner's baton.

Text 
The Vaterländisch Weinlied uses a text by August Silberstein.

Music 
The 12-bar long work in C major is scored for  choir - "" ("a drinking song with higher ethical background"), which exhibits a peculiar imprint with unexpected inflexions and austere harmonies in a narrow time span.

Discography 
There is a single recording of Vaterländisch Weinlied.
 Thomas Kerbl, Männerchorvereinigung Bruckner 12, Weltliche Männerchöre – CD: LIVA 054, 2012 – 1st and 6th strophes

References

Sources 
 Anton Bruckner – Sämtliche Werke, Band XXIII/2:  Weltliche Chorwerke (1843–1893), Musikwissenschaftlicher Verlag der Internationalen Bruckner-Gesellschaft, Angela Pachovsky and Anton Reinthaler (Editor), Vienna, 1989
 Cornelis van Zwol, Anton Bruckner 1824–1896 – Leven en werken, uitg. Thoth, Bussum, Netherlands, 2012. 
 Uwe Harten, Anton Bruckner. Ein Handbuch. , Salzburg, 1996. .
 Crawford Howie, Anton Bruckner - A documentary biography, online revised edition

External links 
 
 Vaterländisch Weinlied C-Dur, WAB 91 – Critical discography by Hans Roelofs 

Weltliche Chorwerke by Anton Bruckner
1866 compositions
Compositions in C major